I wish you were here may refer to:

Zaion: I Wish You Were Here, a Japanese anime video animation
"I Wish You Were Here", a song by Matchbook Romance on their 2006 album Voices
"I Wish You Were Here", a 2001 hit underground house music song by John Creamer & Stephane K ft. Nkemdi
"I Wish You Were Here", a song by Offer Nissim featuring Maya Simantov

See also 
 Wish You Were Here (disambiguation)